Hajmel is a village and a former municipality in the Shkodër County, northwestern Albania. At the 2015 local government reform it became a subdivision of the municipality Vau i Dejës. The population at the 2011 census was 4,430.

Settlements 
There are 5 settlements within Hajmel.

 Dheu i Lehtë
 Hajmel
 Nënshat
 Paçram
 Pistull

References 

 
Administrative units of Vau i Dejës
Former municipalities in Shkodër County
Villages in Shkodër County